Hemerophila houttuinialis is a moth in the family Choreutidae. It was described by Pieter Cramer in 1782. It is found in Suriname.

References

Choreutidae
Moths described in 1782